Kristof Vliegen was the defending champion; however, he did not take part in the 2009 championships.
Michael Berrer defeated 6–3, 6–4 Alexander Kudryavtsev in the final.

Seeds

Draw

Final four

Top half

Bottom half

Sources
 Main draw

External links
 Qualifying draw

2009 ATP Challenger Tour